Salvatore Pezzella (born 11 March 2000) is an Italian professional footballer who plays as a midfielder for  club Triestina.

Club career

Roma
He is a product of Roma youth teams and started playing for their Under-19 squad in the 2017–18 season.

He appeared for the senior squad in the summer 2017 and summer 2018 pre-season friendlies. In March 2019, he was called up to the senior squad for a Serie A game, but remained on the bench.

Loan to Modena
On 17 July 2019, Pezzella joined newly-promoted Serie C club Modena on loan. He made his professional Serie C debut for Modena on 25 August as a substitute replacing Gianluca Laurenti in the 61st minute of a 0–0 home draw Vicenza Virtus. He made his first starting-lineup appearance one month later, on 25 September, against Sambenedettese, he was replaced by Andrea Ingegneri after 58 minutes. On 21 October he played his first entire match for the club and he also scored his first professional goal in the 48th minute of a 1–1 home draw against Fermana. On 1 December he scored his second goal for the club in the 48th minute of a 3–1 home win over Vis Pesaro. Pezzella ended his season-long loan to Modena with 24 appearances, 2 goals and 1 assist.

Loan to Reggiana 
On 24 August 2020, Pezzella was loaned to newly-promoted Serie B club Reggiana on a season-long loan deal.

Loan to Siena
On 28 August 2021, Pezzella was sent on a season-long loan to Siena.

Triestina
On 19 July 2022, Pezzella joined Triestina on a two-year contract.

International career
He was first called up to represent his country for the Under-16 squad friendlies in 2016.

He later appeared in friendlies on the Under-17 and Under-18 levels.

Career statistics

Club

Honours

Club 
Roma Primavera
 Coppa Italia Primavera: 2016-17
 Supercoppa Primavera: 2017

References

2000 births
Living people
Footballers from Rome
Italian footballers
Association football midfielders
Serie B players
Serie C players
A.S. Roma players
Modena F.C. players
A.C. Reggiana 1919 players
A.C.N. Siena 1904 players
U.S. Triestina Calcio 1918 players
Italy youth international footballers